Stacey Snider (born April 29, 1961) is an American film industry executive. She previously served as Chairman and CEO of 20th Century Fox before its acquisition by The Walt Disney Company.

Biography
Snider was born to a Jewish family. From 1999 to 2006, Snider was Chairman of Universal Pictures. From 2006 to 2014, she served as the Co-Chairman/CEO of DreamWorks. On June 16, 2016, it was announced that Snider, after serving as Co-Chairman since 2014, would be taking over for Jim Gianopulos as Chairman and CEO of Twentieth Century Fox Film Corporation as of June 30, 2017. She now runs Elisabeth Murdoch's Sister.

She earned a Bachelor of Arts from the University of Pennsylvania in 1982 and a Juris Doctor from the University of California, Los Angeles in 1985.

Personal life 
Snider is a member of the Wilshire Boulevard Temple.

References

External links 

 Jewish Women's Archive webpage on Stacey Snider

Living people
American women chief executives
20th-century American Jews
1961 births
Film distributors (people)
University of Pennsylvania alumni
UCLA School of Law alumni
20th Century Studios people
Friends' Central School alumni
21st-century American Jews